Jahar Roy (19 September 1919 – 1 August 1977) was an Indian actor and comedian in Bengali cinema. He was known for his comedy films with Bhanu Bandyopadhyay.

Early life 
Roy came from a Bengali Baidya family having its root in Mahilara, Barisal District (of the present Bangladesh). His father Satya Roy was also an actor and later moved to Patna, in search of livelihood. It is here where Jahar Roy completed his studies and started working on odd jobs such as proof reader, medical representative and finally a tailor. He left all these and came to Calcutta around 1946.

Movie career 
Roy earned a substantial fan following even though he was a character actor. And all thanks to his roly-poly build, he was a frequent choice of directors who wanted to add comedy to serious movies. Roy's first major film roles were in Purbarag directed by Ardhendu Mukherjee, and in Anjangarh (1948) directed by Bimal Roy. Among his countless performances are Dhanyee Meye, Chadmabeshi and Bhanu Goenda Jahar Assistant. He acted in a couple of films under the direction of Satyajit Ray. Although a small role, Roy portrayed the male servant of Tulsi Chakrabarti in Parash Pathar. There was a meatier role in Goopy Gyne Bagha Byne where he played the role of a crooked war warmongering minister of an innocent and peace-loving king. He also performed the song Cho Cho Kya Sharam Ki Baat in Chhadmabeshi. At the end of his career, when he was ailing, he did a cameo in Ritwik Ghatak's autobiographical film Jukti Takko Aar Gappo. He acted in around 350 films.

Theatre and comedy 
Jahor Roy was also known for his contribution to Bengali theatre. In a career spanning 2 decades he has acted in several plays. He has been a lifelong associate of Rang Mahal theatre in Kolkata. His performance in plays such a Adarsha Hindu Hotel, Ulka, Subarnagolak and Anartha are still remembered.

He was known to be an wise cracker and at the same time used physical comedy. He composed several skits such as Nyapasur Badh, Function theke shashan and many more. Unfortunately most of those are not available now.

Selected filmography

E Jahar sey Jahar noy

References

External links

1977 deaths
1919 births
Male actors in Bengali cinema
Indian male comedians
Indian male stage actors
20th-century Indian male actors
People from British India
20th-century comedians